Yevgeni Leonidovich Kasyanenko (born 10 March 1965) is a former Russian football player.

Honours
Irtysh Pavlodar
Kazakhstan Premier League runner-up: 1996

References

1965 births
Living people
Soviet footballers
FC Luch Vladivostok players
Russian footballers
Russian Premier League players
Kazakhstan Premier League players
FC Irtysh Pavlodar players
Russian expatriate footballers
Expatriate footballers in Kazakhstan

Association football midfielders